José Ely de Miranda (8 August 1932 – 14 June 2015), commonly known as Zito, was a Brazilian footballer who played as a midfielder. He is regarded as one of the biggest idols of Santos FC, the club he represented for 15 years. His club career was spent mostly in the service of Santos, captaining a side including Pelé to domestic and international successes. He was also part of the Brazilian squads which won the World Cup in 1958 and 1962.

After his retirement as a player, Zito remained at Santos as a director and youth coordinator, developing several young future international players.

Early life
Born in Roseira, São Paulo, Zito initially intended to become a schoolteacher, and attended technical schools in his hometown, before pursuing a career as a footballer.

Playing career

Zito joined Santos in 1952, after finishing his formation at hometown amateur club Roseira FC, and spending two years at Taubaté. He made his debut for Peixe on 29 June 1952 in a 3–1 friendly win against Madureira.

Zito appeared regularly for Santos in the following 15 years, playing 733 games and scoring 57 goals. He was the captain of the Os Santásticos team of the late 1950s and 1960s, playing alongside Pelé, Pepe and other Brazilian stars.

Zito was nicknamed Gerente (manager in Portuguese) by the media during his playing days, due to helping the manager Lula while outfields. Despite missing the two last games of 1963 Intercontinental Cup due to an injury, he acted as Lula's assistant during both matches as his team won the second title in a row.

Zito played his last match on 7 November 1967, a 5–0 win against a mix between Ferroviário and Fortaleza at the Estádio Presidente Vargas.

At international level, he earned 52 caps for Brazil. He partnered Didi in midfield, and was part of the squad which won the 1958 FIFA World Cup final against hosts Sweden; after starting the tournament as a reserve, he finished it as an undisputed starter. In the 1962 edition in Chile, he was named in the Team of the Tournament. In the final of that tournament, Zito headed Brazil into the lead as they came from behind to win 3–1 against Czechoslovakia with Pelé absent through injury.

Style of play
A strong, commanding and influential midfielder, known for his leadership, Zito usually played in a supporting role as a wing-half or half-back, serving as a defensive foil to his more offensive minded teammates. An intelligent and highly organised player, he was known for his ability to win back possession with his tackling, and subsequently set the tempo in midfield through his movement off the ball and precise passing; although he was competent in possession, he preferred to play the ball to other more creative and skilful midfielders rather than carry it forward himself. He was also capable of starting attacking plays after winning the ball by quickly distributing the ball forward with simple, yet neat and efficient passes.

Life after football
After retiring Zito was a vice-president at Santos between 1978 and 1982. After one year away from the club, he was named director of football by president Milton Teixeira, but left the post in 1987. In 2000, he was named a youth coordinate, helping the club to promote youngsters Robinho and Diego to the first team.

Zito was credited with bringing 11-year-old Neymar to the club in 2003. With Gabriel, he was also the scout who saw the player and brought him to the club's youth system.

Death
Zito suffered from Alzheimer's disease and had memory lapses. Following a stroke the year before, Zito died on 14 June 2015 aged 82 in Santos, São Paulo.

In his honour, Santos decided to use the "Z" letter in the captain's armband (instead of the regular "C" used by most teams) from 2015 onwards.

Honours

Club
Santos
 Taça Brasil: 1961, 1962, 1963, 1964, 1965
 Campeonato Paulista: 1955, 1956, 1958, 1960, 1961, 1962, 1964, 1965, 1967
 Torneio Rio–São Paulo: 1959, 1963, 1964, 1966
 Copa Libertadores: 1962, 1963
 Intercontinental Cup: 1962, 1963

International
Brazil
 FIFA World Cup: 1958, 1962

Individual
 FIFA World Cup All-Star Team: 1962
 World Soccer World XI: 1962

References

External links

1932 births
2015 deaths
Footballers from São Paulo (state)
Brazilian footballers
Association football midfielders
Esporte Clube Taubaté players
Santos FC players
Campeonato Brasileiro Série A players
Brazil international footballers
1958 FIFA World Cup players
1962 FIFA World Cup players
1966 FIFA World Cup players
Copa Libertadores-winning players
FIFA World Cup-winning players
People with Alzheimer's disease